Kirby is an unincorporated community in Hampshire County in the U.S. state of West Virginia situated along Grassy Lick Run, a tributary of North River. Kirby is located south of Romney at the crossroads of Grassy Lick Road (West Virginia Secondary Route 10) and Rock Oak Road (West Virginia Secondary Route 10/6).

An early postmaster named Kirby gave the community his name.

Historic site 
 Cox's Store (c. 1864)

References 

Unincorporated communities in Hampshire County, West Virginia
Unincorporated communities in West Virginia